Robert Henry Holmes (July 25, 1888 – August 6, 1917) was the first NYPD African-American officer to die in the line of duty.

Born in Charleston, South Carolina, Holmes was appointed as an NYPD police officer on August 25, 1913. He was assigned to the 38th precinct in Harlem. Officer Holmes was shot to death while chasing and exchanging gunfire with a burglar.

References

External links
Profile, FindaGrave.com; accessed November 4, 2014.

1888 births
1917 deaths
New York City Police Department officers
People from Charleston, South Carolina
African-American police officers
Male murder victims
People murdered in New York City
Deaths by firearm in Manhattan
20th-century African-American people